The lipstick index is a term coined by Leonard Lauder, chairman of the board of Estee Lauder, used to describe increased sales of cosmetics during the early 2000s recession. Lauder made the claim that lipstick sales could be an economic indicator, in that purchases of cosmetics – lipstick in particular – tend to be inversely correlated to economic health. The speculation was that women substitute lipstick for more expensive purchases like dresses and shoes in times of economic distress. 

Lauder identified the Lipstick index as sales across the Estee Lauder family of brands. Subsequent recessions, including the late-2000s recession, provided controverting evidence to Lauder's claims, as sales have actually fallen with reduced economic activity. Conversely, lipstick sales have experienced growth during periods of increased economic activity. As a result, the lipstick index has been discredited as an economic indicator. The increased sales of cosmetics in 2001 has since been attributed to increased interest in celebrity-designed cosmetics brands.

In the 2010s, many media outlets reported that with the rise of nail art as fad in the English-speaking countries and as far afield as Japan and the Philippines, nailpolish had replaced lipstick as the main affordable indulgence for women in place of bags and shoes during recession, leading to talk of a nail polish index. Similar sentiment was noted during the coronavirus pandemic, when the mandated use of face masks to prevent the spread of the disease resulted in an increase of eye makeup purchases, suggesting a Mascara index.

References

Price indices
Cosmetics
2000s neologisms